Dean Willeford (born October 9, 1944) is an American water polo player. He competed in the men's tournament at the 1968 Summer Olympics. In 1982, he was inducted into the USA Water Polo Hall of Fame.

References

External links
 

1944 births
Living people
American male water polo players
Olympic water polo players of the United States
Water polo players at the 1968 Summer Olympics
Sportspeople from Dallas